Malu Mirisata (spicy Sri Lankan fish curry) has more of a chili flavor and it's a favorite method of cooking fish in Sri Lanka. The dish is popular around the country and mostly in seaboard area where fish and other seafood are staple foods. Coconut milk is used in some variations of this dish. This can be usually served with rice, bread or string hoppers.

History
This method of cooking fish has its origin in Sri Lanka.

Preparation

This is a very simple method of cooking fish with chili as a flavor, and using only a few ingredients. This curry is also mass-produced for consumer purchase in packages such as cans and flexible pouches.

See also
 Fish curry (disambiguation)
 Cuisine of Sri Lanka

References

External links
 https://www.youtube.com/watch?v=Et9QWrSSB-s

Sri Lankan fish dishes
Sri Lankan curries
Fish dishes